Wat Si Muang or Simuong (Lao: ວັດສີເມືອງ) is a Buddhist temple in Vientiane, the capital of Laos.

History
The temple was built in 1563, in the former Kingdom of Lan Xang. A statue of King Sisavang Vong stands in front of Wat Simuang.

There is a legend that pregnant women at the time of construction were given to as sacrifice to God.

Description
Inside, the temple is unusual in being divided into two rooms. The front room is quiet, with a monk usually on hand to give blessings. The rear room houses the large main altar, with statues and images of the Buddha.

Gallery

References

Buddhist temples in Laos
Buildings and structures in Vientiane
Religious buildings and structures completed in 1563
1563 establishments in Asia
16th century in Lan Xang
Tourist attractions in Vientiane
16th-century Buddhist temples